Underbelly: Badness, the fifth series of the Nine Network crime drama series Underbelly, originally aired from 13 August 2012 to 1 October 2012. It is an eight-part series detailing real events that occurred in Sydney between 2001 and 2012. The series began its production in early 2012 and towards the middle of the year filming eventually commenced. A teaser clip for the series was released by the Nine Network indicating the core cast of the series. Caroline Craig returns to narrate the series for a fifth time. It was the first season of the franchise not to have 13 episodes.

Premise
The fifth season of Underbelly depicted  the criminal activities of recently convicted Australian kidnapper, murderer and drug-dealer Anthony Perish's (aka "Rooster") criminal activities around the Sydney suburb of Lindfield and adjacent areas and how the New South Wales Police 'Strike Force Tuno' finally apprehended him after almost a decade of intensive surveillance and informant information.

Anthony "Rooster" Perish  would never have been caught if it was not for the dedication and perseverance of New South Wales police officer Det. Insp. Gary Jubelin. The series covers the scope and breadth of homicide, kidnapping, firearm offences and drug dealing committed under the direction of Anthony Perish, his brother Andrew Perish, various other criminal associates and several criminal Australian "motorcycle clubs."

Cast

Main cast 
 Matt Nable as Detective Gary Jubelin, head of Strike Force Tuno
 Jonathan LaPaglia as  Anthony Perish ruthless underworld boss with no recorded history and murderer of Terry Falconer
 Ben Winspear as Detective Tim Browne, second-in-command of Tuno
 Josh Quong Tart as Andrew 'Undies' Perish, brother of Anthony Perish
 Jason Montgomery as Brett 'Decker' Simpson, Anthony's henchman and hitman
 Ella Scott Lynch as Senior Constable Camille Alavoine, Police analyst of Tuno
 Justin Smith as Matthew 'Muzz' Lawton Anthony's right-hand man
 Aaron Jeffery as Frank 'Tink' O'Rourke, Strike Force Tuno's informant

Recurring and guest cast 
 Goran D. Kleut as Jasper Pengilly, Leader of the Living Dead Motorcycle Club
 Jodi Gordon as Kylie Keogh, police media officer assisting Tuno
 P.J. Lane as Michael Christiansen, Steroid using associate of Decker
 Leeanna Walsman as Detective Pam Young
 Steven Vidler as Police Commander Howard
 Luke Bovino as Vito Russo, Decker's associate
 Geordie Robinson as Craig 'Schiz' Bottin, Drug Cook and Decker's associate
 Sophie Webb as Lauren Perish, Andrew Perish's wife
 Hollie Andrew as Tracy Shepperd, Psychologist & Gary Jubelin's girlfriend
 Zara Michales as Pippa, Frank O'Rourke's girlfriend
 Luke Pegler as Detective Luke Rankin

Production
On 17 April 2012, a reporter for The Sydney Morning Herald announced filming had begun on the fifth instalment of the Underbelly series in Sydney. Underbelly: Badness is set from 2001-2012 and tells the story of "underworld figure" Anthony Perish and the team of police who helped bring him to justice. Jo Rooney, the Nine Network's drama executive, stated "Underbelly: Badness is a riveting and compelling story of a modern underworld figure that merged into the fabric of our community completely under the radar, and we are very proud to shine a light on this story and bring it to Australian audiences." The eight-part series was directed by Tony Tilse, David Caesar and Ian Watson.

Episodes

Notes 
  An episode of Person of Interest was replaced with episode seven of Underbelly: Badness in the southern states on 17 September due to the Brownlow Medal award coverage that took place on 24 September in Melbourne. The episode aired in the northern states at the same time as the Brownlow Medal award coverage aired in the southern states.

Reception
Giles Hardie writing for The Sydney Morning Herald gave the first episode an A grade for "awesome glaring goodness". He explained "Underbelly: Dexter delivers. The franchise is back and despite the worst title to date, this looks like a substantial and welcome revamp of the franchise, based around a legitimately captivating criminal." He stated that the episode was worth watching again, adding that it was an "access point for those who prefer shows about the good guys not just the psychopaths."

References

External links

Nine Network original programming
2010s Australian drama television series
2010s Australian television miniseries
2012 Australian television seasons
2012 Australian television series debuts
2012 Australian television series endings
2010s Australian crime television series
Television shows set in New South Wales
Organised crime in Sydney